The Yax lizard or Jacques lizard is a Chinese internet phenomenon related to the Baidu 10 Mythical Creatures.  It mocks a musical dance program that excessively praised the Chinese government.

The creature was supposedly a Komodo dragon. The name is derived from "yakexi", which is the Chinese transliteration of a Uyghur term "yaxshi", which means "good" or "great"; "xi" also means "lizard" in Chinese.

Origin
It is named after the Xinjiang musical dance program "Happy life Yaxshi" (formerly "The Party's Policy Yaxshi") in the CCTV Spring Festival's Gala 2010. In the program, singers and dancers sing praises of how happy their life is, with the chorus line of, "What is yakexi? What is yakexi? The Chinese Communist Party's policies are yakexi."

Description
Blogger Han Han said that Yax lizards live in the area between Gurbantünggüt Desert and Irtysh River, north to Dzungaria, Xinjiang. They eat snails and even mice. They also arrive the riverine area of Irtysh River to eat dead fishes, river crabs, frogs and so on every year from April to June.

Response
Han Han held a contest on his blog asking for submissions of alternative lyrics to the song, keeping the original chorus line of "What is yakexi? What is yakexi? The Chinese Communist Party's policies are yakexi." Submissions included lyrics mocking the original song by describing things such as bad housing situations and high tuition prices.

To demonstrate their dissatisfaction towards Chinese government's propaganda, some netizens name the species as "Yakshit" by the Chinese character's pronunciation.

See also
Grass Mud Horse
River crab (Internet slang)
Jia Junpeng
Very erotic very violent

References

External links
South China Morning Post article
Douban full party song lyrics translated in English
Global Voices brief report
article LA times mention

Internet memes
Chinese Internet slang
Fictional lizards